is a Japanese physician, professor and infectious diseases expert at Kobe University.

Career
In the next year, he became a medical intern worked at St. Luke's Roosevelt Hospital of Columbia University.

Iwata started his career as an internist at Mount Sinai Beth Israel in 2001. Since 2008 he served as Clinical Department Head Professor of Kobe University.

COVID-19 outbreak

During the COVID-19 pandemic in Japan, the cruise ship Diamond Princess was quarantined in the Port of Yokohama in Japan. Iwata strongly criticised the management of the situation in two widely circulated YouTube videos published on 18 February. In videos, he described the conditions of quarantined Diamond Princess as "completely chaotic", and called the ship a "COVID-19 mill". Iwata briefly gained physical access to the ship, saying he observed no infection control measures in place. After being "kicked off" the ship after and then voluntarily quarantining himself, he stated "we have to do something about this cruise. We have to help people inside the ship." On 20 February, he deleted the videos himself, and said "there is no need for further discussing this". He also denied he had been pressured to delete the videos.

In April 2020 he expressed pessimism that the Olympics could be held in 2021.

References

External links
 
 

1971 births
Living people
Japanese medical researchers
Internists
Epidemiologists
Academic staff of Kobe University
People from Shimane Prefecture
COVID-19 researchers